The 2023 World Junior Figure Skating Championships was held in Calgary, Canada, from February 27 to March 5, 2023. Medals were be awarded in the disciplines of men's singles, women's singles, pairs, and ice dance. The competition determined the entry quotas for each federation at the 2024 World Junior Championships.

On March 1, 2022, the ISU banned figure skaters and officials from Russia and Belarus from attending all international competitions due to the 2022 Russian invasion of Ukraine.

Qualification

Age and minimum TES requirements 
Skaters were eligible for the 2023 World Junior Championships if they turned 13 years of age before July 1, 2022, and if they have not yet turned 19 (singles and females of the other two disciplines) or 21 (male pair skaters and ice dancers).

Aditionally, skaters must meet the minimum technical elements score requirements. The ISU accepts scores if they were obtained at junior-level ISU-recognized international competitions during the ongoing or preceding season, no later than 21 days before the first official practice day.

Number of entries per discipline 
Based on the results of the 2022 World Junior Championships, each ISU member nation could field one to three entries per discipline. China did not participate due to COVID-19 protocols, and may only field one entry.

Entries
Member nations began announcing their selections in December 2022. The International Skating Union published entries on February 7, 2023.

Changes to preliminary assignments

Medal summary

Medalists
Medals awarded to the skaters who achieve the highest overall placements in each discipline:

Small medals awarded to the skaters who achieve the highest short program or rhythm dance placements in each discipline:

Small medals awarded to the skaters who achieve the highest free skating or free dance placements in each discipline:

Medals by country
Table of medals for overall placement:

Table of small medals for placement in the short/rhythm segment:

Table of small medals for placement in the free segment:

Record 

The following new ISU best score was set during this competition:

Results

Men

Women

Pairs

Ice dance

References

External links 
 World Junior Championships at the International Skating Union

World Junior Figure Skating Championships
2023 World Junior Figure Skating Championships
World Junior Figure Skating Championships
2023 in Canadian sports
February 2023 sports events in Canada
March 2023 sports events in Canada
Sport in Calgary